Schistocephalus  is a genus of tapeworm of fish, fish-eating birds and rodents.

Diversity
Three species of Schistocephalus have been described;

References

Cestoda genera
Parasitic helminths of fish
Parasites of birds
Parasites of rodents